Starting Now is the debut studio album by American country music artist Chuck Wicks. It was released on January 22, 2008. The album debuted at number 24 on the U.S. Billboard 200 chart, selling about 20,000 copies in its first week. Wicks co-wrote all but one of the songs.

"Stealing Cinderella", which was released as the album's lead single in September 2007, was a top 5 hit on the Hot Country Songs chart. The album produced two more top 40 hits with "All I Ever Wanted" and "Man of the House".

Track listing

Personnel
Bruce Bouton – steel guitar
Perry Coleman – background vocals
J. T. Corenflos – electric guitar
Chip Davis – background vocals
Dan Dugmore – steel guitar
Shannon Forrest – drums
Tony Harrell – keyboards
Dann Huff – electric guitar
Charles Judge – conductor, string arrangements, keyboards, Hammond organ, synthesizer strings
Troy Lancaster – electric guitar
Mitch Malloy – background vocals
Michael Mobley – background vocals
Nashville String Machine – string section
Steve Nathan – piano
Russ Pahl – steel guitar
Monty Powell – electric guitar, background vocals
Jason Sellers – background vocals
Russell Terrell – background vocals
Ilya Toshinsky – acoustic guitar, background vocals
Anna Wilson – background vocals
Glenn Worf – bass guitar
Jonathan Yudkin – fiddle, mandolin

Chart performance

Weekly charts

Year-end charts

Singles

References 

2008 debut albums
RCA Records albums
Chuck Wicks albums
Albums produced by Dann Huff